Cogmind is a tactical science fiction roguelike available for Windows developed by Grid Sage Games, a company founded by Josh Ge. Before its  Steam early access release on 16 October 2017, it underwent public testing through alpha and beta stages.

Gameplay
The player character is a robot which is able to salvage parts from the remains of other robots; the game includes over 1000 of these parts. Character development is primarily focused around equipment: parts can be gained and used to level up, but also lost. Another distinguishing feature is the in-game interface, which is considered to be user-friendly compared to other roguelikes. The game also features a destructible environment, "a living ecosystem" of robot types, and a detailed stealth system that minimises dependence on combat.

Development
Cogmind originated as an entry for the 2012 7 Day Roguelike Challenge, and was based on Ge's previous roguelike X@COM. After the challenge, Ge decided to develop the concept further, releasing the first public alpha in 24 May 2015; though Ge considered the alpha to be on the level of many games' release candidates. In the beginning of 2016, it was selected as one of Destructoid's top indie games to look for in 2016. Grid Sage Games released a public beta on 6 May 2017. This was followed by an early access release on Steam on 16 October. Despite this appellation, Ge stated that it was "a very complete experience", and that he only planned to withhold it from full release for around 6 months.

References

External links 
 

Roguelike video games
Video games developed in Taiwan
Windows games
Windows-only games
2015 video games
Science fiction video games
Video games about robots
Hacking video games